The Mississippi Sea Wolves are a professional hockey team based in Biloxi, Mississippi, and play in the Mississippi Coast Coliseum. The Sea Wolves are members of the FPHL. They are a revival of a team by the same name that played in  the ECHL, making them a phoenix club.

The ECHL’s Sea Wolves were founded in 1996 and had considerable success over their 10 seasons in the league. They reached the playoffs in five of their first seven years and a league championship in 1999, when they defeated the Richmond Renegades in a best-of-seven series to claim the Kelly Cup.

Damages from Hurricane Katrina to the Mississippi Coast Coliseum forced the team to suspend operations for the 2005–06 and 2006–07 seasons under the ECHL's hardship provisions. Hurricane Katrina resulted in extensive damage to the team’s home arena, including flood damage to team offices, locker rooms, ice-making equipment, and two Zambonis. During the 2006–07 ECHL All-Star Game, the league officially confirmed the Sea Wolves would return in 2007–08.

On March 30, 2009, the Sea Wolves announced that the organization would be suspending operations again for the 2009–10 season. Still, a little more than a month later the team's management announced that professional hockey would continue to be played on the Mississippi Gulf Coast in the form of the Mississippi Surge in the Southern Professional Hockey League. The Surge played at the Coast Coliseum from the 2009–10 season through 2013–14.

In 2021, the Federal Prospects Hockey League hosted three neutral site games in Biloxi. Biloxi Pro Hockey sold 20,163 tickets in the month of December and an announcement was made on December 30 that the Sea Wolves would return in 2022. On April 27, 2022, the team announced Phil Esposito, a former ECHL player and winningest FPHL Head Coach, will serve as the teams first head coach in its FPHL history.

After a 2-9-2 start to their inaugural FPHL season, Esposito was relieved of his duties on November 28, to be replaced by team CEO, Defenseman, and director of Hockey Operations Joe Pace Jr. as interim Head Coach/Player.

History

References

External links
 Sea Wolves Home Page
 Sea Wolves HockeyDB (1996–2005)
 Sea Wolves HockeyDB (2007–2009)

Defunct ECHL teams
Tampa Bay Lightning minor league affiliates
Norfolk Admirals
Ice hockey teams in Mississippi
Arizona Coyotes minor league affiliates
Los Angeles Kings minor league affiliates
Minnesota Wild minor league affiliates
Montreal Canadiens minor league affiliates
Philadelphia Flyers minor league affiliates
Defunct ice hockey teams in the United States
1996 establishments in Mississippi
2009 disestablishments in Mississippi
Ice hockey clubs established in 1996
Ice hockey clubs disestablished in 2009
Sports in Biloxi, Mississippi